Michael Waddell may refer to:

 Michael Waddell (American football) (born 1981), who played for the Tennessee Titans and Oakland Raiders
 Mike Waddell (musician), a clarinetist, saxophonist, and composer
 Mike Waddell (sports administrator), American professional-sports executive formerly involved in college sports
 Michael Osborne Waddell (1922–2015), British Army officer
 Mike Waddell, one of the Progressive Conservative Party of Manitoba candidates, 2007 Manitoba provincial election

See also
 Michael Waddell's Bone Collector:The Brotherhood Album, an album by Dallas Davidson